Becoming Something Else is the only studio album by British nu metal band SugarComa. The album was released on 5 August 2002 by Music For Nations.

Track listing

Personnel

SugarComa
 Jessica Mayers – vocals
 Claire Simson – guitars 
 Heidi McEwan – bass guitar
 James Cuthbert – drums

Additional personnel
 Colin Richardson – production, engineering
 Ewan Davies – engineering
 Ray Staff – mastering

References

2002 debut albums
SugarComa albums
Music for Nations albums
Albums produced by Colin Richardson